Naby Laye Keïta (born 10 February 1995) is a Guinean professional footballer who plays as a central midfielder for  club Liverpool and the Guinea national team.

Keïta began his professional career with Ligue 2 club FC Istres in 2013, and a year later he moved to Red Bull Salzburg, where he won the Austrian Football Bundesliga and Austrian Cup double in both of his seasons. He then moved to RB Leipzig in 2016, making the Bundesliga team of the season in his first year and the UEFA Europa League squad of the season in his second. He agreed to join Liverpool in 2017, and completed the move a year later, winning the UEFA Champions League in his first season at the club, and the FIFA Club World Cup and Premier League the following season.

Keïta made his senior international debut for Guinea in 2012. He has earned over 40 caps and was part of their squad at the Africa Cup of Nations in 2015, 2019 and 2021.

Early life
Naby Laye Keïta was born on 10 February 1995 in Conakry.

Club career

FC Istres
Keïta joined hometown club Horoya AC aged nine. He moved to France in 2012, joining the youth team of FC Istres after unsuccessful trials at FC Lorient and Le Mans FC.

In 2013, he was promoted to the first team of Istres. He made his Ligue 2 debut on 22 November 2013 against Nîmes Olympique. He scored 11 goals in 23 games in his first season as a professional,  while his team were relegated to the Championnat National.

Red Bull Salzburg

In 2014, he joined Austrian top division side Red Bull Salzburg. He made his league debut on 26 July 2014 against Wiener Neustadt. Keïta ended the season with five goals and two assists in 30 games, winning the league and cup double. The following season, he was selected as the Austrian Bundesliga Player of the Year.

RB Leipzig
In June 2016, Keïta moved to Red Bull Salzburg sister-club RB Leipzig, who had just been promoted to the German Bundesliga. He scored the winner on his league debut against Borussia Dortmund and scored seven more goals in his debut Bundesliga season. He was named in the league's team of the season.

Keïta was named in the squad of the season for the 2017–18 UEFA Europa League, in which his team were quarter-finalists.

Liverpool

2017–18 season
On 28 August 2017, a deal was struck for Keïta to join Liverpool on 1 July 2018 after the English club triggered his £48 million release clause in addition to paying an undisclosed premium. It was then reported that there would be no premium (£48 million total) if Leipzig did not qualify for European football, £4.75 million (£52.75 million total) if they qualified for the Europa League and £11 million (£59 million total) if they finished in the Champions League spots. Leipzig ultimately finished 6th in the Bundesliga, therefore qualifying for the Europa League.

2018–19 season
Upon joining Liverpool, he was handed the number 8 shirt by Liverpool legend, Steven Gerrard, which had been vacated upon the departure of Gerrard to LA Galaxy in 2015. Keïta made his debut for Liverpool against West Ham United on 12 August 2018 and played a part in the opening goal for Mohamed Salah in a 4–0 win.

On 5 April 2019, Keïta scored his first goal for Liverpool in a 3–1 win against Southampton, and added a first European goal four days later against FC Porto in the UEFA Champions League quarter-final first leg. He was injured in May 2019, ruling him out for the rest of the season. Although Keïta was injured, he won his first Liverpool title while out of the matchday squad as his team mates secured the win in the Champions League final against Tottenham Hotspur in early June.

Këita started in the Carabao Cup final for Liveprool after Thiago sustained an injury in warm up.

2019–20 season 

Hampered by injury, Keïta was a fringe player during the early part of the subsequent season. On 7 December, he provided a goal and assist in a 3–0 win away against AFC Bournemouth, a game which marked his first league start of the season. On 10 December, he provided Liverpool's first goal in a 2–0 Champions League win against his former club, Salzburg, which saw the reigning European champions progress to the knockout stages as the victors of Group E. 

On 18 December, he scored the opening goal in a 2–1 win over Mexican club Monterrey as Liverpool progressed to the Club World Cup final; three days later, on 21 December, he started in the final against Flamengo, playing 100 minutes until being substituted as Liverpool won 1–0 to be crowned world club champions. On 2 January 2020, he was named in the starting line-up against Sheffield United, but was withdrawn after sustaining a groin injury during the warm-up, being replaced by James Milner. At the end of the season, Keïta won the Premier League title with Liverpool.

International career
On 14 December 2012, Keïta made his international debut for the Guinea national team against Sierra Leone in a 2014 African Nations Championship qualification match. He scored the opener for his side in a 1–1 away draw.

Keïta was included in Michel Dussuyer's 23-man squad for the 2015 Africa Cup of Nations in Equatorial Guinea. In the opening match against the Ivory Coast, he was struck in the face by Gervinho, who was red carded for it.

On 12 November 2015, Keïta scored his first international goal in three years, in a 1–0 away win against Namibia in the first leg of the second round of 2018 FIFA World Cup qualification. Three days later in the return leg – in Morocco due to the Ebola virus epidemic in Guinea – he scored again in a 2–0 win.

Manager Paul Put chose Keïta for the 2019 Africa Cup of Nations in Egypt, where he was affected by injuries. In January 2022, Keïta helped Guinea qualify for the round of 16 of the 2021 Africa Cup of Nations in Cameroon. His performances saw him earn a place in the tournament's best eleven of the group stage. However, Guinea were eliminated after a loss to Gambia, a match Keïta could not play due to yellow cards accumulation.

Style of play
While writing for The Guardian, Nick Ames and Nick Miller described Keïta as "a dynamic, box-to-box central midfielder," likening him to N'Golo Kanté. They also noted, however, that he is able to distribute the ball with range and accuracy, and score goals, which has instead frequently led him to be compared to Brazilian-Portuguese former playmaker Deco. David Usher of ESPN has described Keïta as an energetic midfielder, with good defensive qualities, which also allows him to play in a holding role if necessary. Usher went on to note that Keïta is "quick, skillful, creative and direct. He can dribble, pass and shoot, and he frequently makes the spectacular look routine". Ralf Rangnick attributes him having a natural 360° radar.

Personal life
Keïta has a younger brother, Petit Keïta, who was previously on the books with German side Inter Leipzig. In October 2018 it was reported that he had been training at Liverpool's Academy, although he was not offered a contract.

In 2017, Keïta was charged with uttering false documents. The German newspaper Bild reported that, in early December 2016 and again six weeks later, he had presented two fake Guinean driving licences in order to obtain a driving licence in Germany. The district court in Leipzig (Amtsgericht Leipzig) fined him €415,000, basing the sentence on Keïta's estimated annual income of around €3 million. Keïta's lawyer filed an appeal. The appeals court reduced the fine to €250,000.

In September 2021, Keïta, his Guinean teammates and their opponents from Morocco were stranded during the 2021 Guinean coup d'état. All returned home safely.

Career statistics

Club

International

Guinea score listed first, score column indicates score after each Keïta goal

Honours

Red Bull Salzburg
Austrian Bundesliga: 2014–15, 2015–16
Austrian Cup: 2014–15, 2015–16

Liverpool
Premier League: 2019–20
FA Cup: 2021–22
EFL Cup: 2021–22
FA Community Shield: 2022
UEFA Champions League: 2018–19; runner-up: 2021–22
FIFA Club World Cup: 2019

Individual
Footballer of the Year in Guinea: 2015, 2021
Austrian Football Bundesliga Player of the Year: 2015–16
Bundesliga Team of the Season: 2016–17
UEFA Europa League Squad of the Season: 2017–18
CAF Team of the Year: 2018

References

External links

Profile at the Liverpool F.C. website

1995 births
Living people
Sportspeople from Conakry
Guinean footballers
Association football midfielders
Horoya AC players
FC Istres players
FC Red Bull Salzburg players
RB Leipzig players
Liverpool F.C. players
Ligue 2 players
Austrian Football Bundesliga players
Bundesliga players
Premier League players
FA Cup Final players
UEFA Champions League winning players
Guinea international footballers
2015 Africa Cup of Nations players
2019 Africa Cup of Nations players
2021 Africa Cup of Nations players
Guinean expatriate footballers
Expatriate footballers in France
Expatriate footballers in Austria
Expatriate footballers in Germany
Expatriate footballers in England
Guinean expatriate sportspeople in France
Guinean expatriate sportspeople in Austria
Guinean expatriate sportspeople in Germany
Guinean expatriate sportspeople in England